The discography of Mika Nakashima includes 11 studio albums, 7 compilation albums, 45 singles and 20 video albums. These have all been released through Sony Music Entertainment Japan.

Albums

Studio albums

Compilation albums

Cover albums

Remix albums

Acoustic albums

Live albums

Extended plays

Singles

As a lead artist

As a featured artist

Promotional singles

Video albums

Music video collections

Live concerts

Documentaries

Other appearances

Notes

References

Discographies of Japanese artists
Pop music discographies
Discography